Cuckoo-dove may refer to a bird in one of three genera in the pigeon and dove family Columbidae:

Macropygia
Reinwardtoena
Turacoena